The United States Air Force's  261st Combat Communications Squadron (261 CBCS) is an Air National Guard combat communications unit located in California.

Mission

History
The 261st Combat Communications Squadron traces its beginnings to the 96th Signal Company, Service Group. Activated at Reno Army Air Base, Nevada on 1 January 1943. The unit moved shortly thereafter to the Army Air Base at Muroc, CA.
Redesignated as the 1096th Signal Company, the unit moved to Great Falls Montana prior to being activated on 17 October 1943. The unit received battle credits during World War II for the New Guinea Campaign, the Southern Philippines Campaign and the Luzon Campaign. Additionally, the unit served in Machinato, Okinawa and Tachikawa Japan where it officially became the 611th Signal Light Company just prior to its inactivation on 25 March 1946.
The 611th Signal Light Company was reorganized on 15 August 1948 at the National Guard Center, Alameda California and received federal recognition on 27 September 1948. At the time of recognition, the unit had two officers and ten enlisted members assigned.
On 1 July 1952, the 611th Signal Light Company was redesignated the 261st Combat Communications Squadron, (Operations) and on 26 January 1953, became part of the California Air National Guard with its move to Hayward Air National Guard Base, California.
On 1 July 1953, the 261st Combat Communications Squadron (Operations) was reassigned to the 146th Fighter-Bomber Wing at Van Nuys Air National Guard Base, California where it remained until its final move to Sepulveda Air National Guard Station on 1 August 1973.
During the 34 years that the unit has been located at Sepulveda Air National Guard Station, members have participated in numerous Joint Forces Exercises and Operations. Personnel assigned to the 261st have served in Korea, Thailand, Japan and Hawaii as well as in Europe, Bosnia, and Southeast and Southwest Asia.

Lineage
 Constituted as the 96th Signal Company, Service Group on 28 December 1942
 Activated on 1 January 1943
 Redesignated 1096th Signal Company, Service Group on 27 October 1943
 Inactivated on 25 March 1946
 Redesignated 111th Signal Light Construction Company and allotted to the National Guard on 24 May 1946
 Designation revoked and changed to 611th Signal Light Construction Company
 Activated on 15 August 1948
 Federal recognition extended on 27 September 1948
 Redesignated 261st Communications Squadron, Operations on 1 July 1952
 Redesignated 261st Radio Relay Squadron on 23 September 1960
 Redesignated 261st Mobile Communications Squadron on 15 March 1968
 Redesignated 261st Combat Communications Squadron on 24 March 1976
 Redesignated 261st Combat Information Systems Squadron on 15 October 1984
 Redesignated 261st Combat Communications Squadron on 1 October 1986
 Redesignated 261st Information Systems Squadron unknown
 Redesignated 261st Network Operations Squadron c. 2014
 Redesignated 261st Cyber Operations Squadron on 1 September 2015

Assignments
 Unknown, 1 January 1943 – 25 March 1946
 61st Fighter Wing, 15 August 1948
 161st Aircraft Control and Warning Group, 1 October 1950
 252d Communications Group, 1 July 1952
 162d Communications Group (later 162d Mobile Communications Group, 162d Combat Communications Group, 162d Combat Information Systems Group, 162d Combat Communications Group), unknown
 195th Operations Group, 1 September 2015 – present

Stations
 Reno Army Air Base, Nevada, 1 January 1943
 Muroc Army Air Base, California, 1943
 Great Falls Army Air Base, Montana, 1943
 Nadzab, New Guinea, 1943
 Leyte, Philippines, 1944
 Clark Air Base, Luzon, Philippines, 1945
 Ie Shima, Ryuk Islands, 1945
 Machinato, Okinawa, 1945
 Tachikawa Air Base, Japan, unknown – 25 March 1946
 Camp Kohler, California, 15 May 1948
 Alameda Air National Guard Base, California, 1951
 Hayward, California, January 1953
 Van Nuys Air National Guard Base, California, July 1953
 Sepulveda Air National Guard Base, California, 1 August 1973
 Van Nuys Air National Guard Station, unknown – present

References

External links

Combat Communications 0261
Military units and formations in California